Attacca is the ninth extended play (EP) by the South Korean boy band Seventeen released on October 22, 2021 by Pledis Entertainment, the EP contains seven tracks including the EP's single "Rock with You".

Background and release 
On August 23, Pledis Entertainment reported that the group is preparing a new album that will be released in October.
This upcoming comeback will be only four months after their previous mini album Your Choice in June and their first album since the members renewed their contracts with Pledis Entertainment.

On September 23, Pledis Entertainment released the concept trailer for Attacca. The trailer instantly grabs viewers’ attention with the word “boyhood” flashing on the screen as a blue teddy bear engulfed in flames is thrown down to the pavement. After several scenes flash in succession–including snippets of the group's members dancing in the street, playing with paintbrushes, riding on motorcycles and playing an electric guitar–all thirteen members come together in the end to admire a sunset on the rooftop of a building, with the album's name and Oct. 22 release date hanging above their heads in animated text.

Later on October 18, The group released a highlight medley of songs from Attacca in a highly stylized video uploaded to their YouTube page.
The video teaser sees the group taking to various sound stages to perform clips of seven songs —  “To you,” “Rock with you,” “Crush,” “PANG!” “Imperfect love,” “I can't run away” and “2 MINUS 1”  — that sees the group members hanging out in a chemistry lab, plant and flower-filled gardens, and warehouses with neon lights. “2 MINUS 1” is the one track from Attacca that was released as a digital single only.

The band shared two music video teasers for their new song "Rock with You" through their official YouTube channel at midnight on October 21.

Attacca was released on October 22. To promote the album, the group held a press conference ahead of its release.

Commercial performance 
On the first day of pre-order, Pledis announced that the album sold 1.41 million pre-order sales, surpassing their previous EP Your Choice, which sold 1.36 million copies.
The album later sold 1.9 million copies in October, making Seventeen's 5th consecutive million sellers in a row.
In November, it became the group's first album to be certified as a double million seller, and currently is Seventeen's best-selling album.

Track listing 

Notes

 "To You" is stylized as "To you"
 "Rock with You" is stylized as "Rock with you"
 "Pang!" is stylized as "PANG!"
 "2 Minus 1" is stylized as "2 MINUS 1"

Charts

Weekly charts

Year-end charts

References

2021 EPs
Korean-language EPs
Seventeen (South Korean band) EPs
Hybe Corporation EPs